David Benjamin Eger (born March 17, 1952) is an American professional golfer on the Champions Tour.

Early life and amateur career 
Eger was born in Fort Meade, Maryland. He attended the University of North Carolina, and later East Tennessee State University.

Professional career 
Eger turned professional in 1978 but won only $31,014 in 58 PGA Tour events with one top-10 finish.

Re-instated amateur status 
In 1982, he went to work as a golf administrator and regained his amateur status. He served as Director of Tournament Administration for the PGA Tour from 1982–92; Senior Director of Rules and Competition for the USGA from 1992–95; and as Vice-President of Competition for the PGA Tour from 1995-96.

As a golf administrator, Eger kept his skills intact by playing competitively as an amateur, winning the 1988 U.S. Mid-Amateur and the North and South Amateur in 1991. He was also a three-time Walker Cup team member and two-time semi-finalist in the U.S. Amateur.

Second professional career 
Eger turned professional for the second time in 2001. He earned a spot on the Champions Tour through qualifying school after preparing with the help of golf instructor David Leadbetter. He has four victories on the tour. Eger won the 2003 MasterCard Classic — the first Champions Tour event ever held in Mexico, and a winner's prize of $300,000. He won his second title in 2005 by shooting a final-round 67 in the inaugural Boeing Greater Seattle Classic, winning  $240,000. His 54-hole score of 199 was 17 under par, three strokes ahead of Tom Kite.

Eger won the Champions Tour Player of the Month award in March 2003. He lives in Charlotte, North Carolina with his wife Tricia. He has two children, Dottie (1982) and Michael (1984).

Eger was the individual who alerted rules officials of Tiger Woods's illegal drop during the second round of the 2013 Masters Tournament.

Amateur wins
1988 U.S. Mid-Amateur
1991 North and South Amateur
1999 Azalea Invitational
2000 Azalea Invitational, North and South Amateur

Professional wins (4)

Champions Tour wins (4)

Champions Tour playoff record (1–2)

Results in major championships

CUT = missed the half-way cut
Note: Eger never played in The Open Championship.

U.S. national team appearances
Amateur
Walker Cup: 1989, 1991 (winners), 2001
Eisenhower Trophy: 1990, 2000 (winners)

See also 

 Spring 1979 PGA Tour Qualifying School graduates

References

External links

The Seattle Times - Eger wins - August 22, 2005

American male golfers
North Carolina Tar Heels men's golfers
East Tennessee State Buccaneers men's golfers
PGA Tour golfers
PGA Tour Champions golfers
Golf administrators
Golfers from Maryland
Golfers from Florida
People from Fort Meade, Maryland
People from Ponte Vedra Beach, Florida
Golfers from Charlotte, North Carolina
1952 births
Living people